Serhiy Mykhailovych Ivliev (born December 4, 1984) is a Ukrainian footballer who plays with FC Continentals in the Canadian Soccer League.

Playing career

Europe 
Ivliev began his career in 2003 with FC Hazovyk-KhGV Kharkiv in the Ukrainian Second League where he spent three seasons. In 2005, he was loaned to FC Dnipro Cherkasy and assisted in winning the league title and securing promotion to the Ukrainian First League. He would play in the second trier but with FC Borysfen Boryspil, but returned to his original club midway through the season as Borysfen went bankrupt. After the season he signed with FC Arsenal Kharkiv in 2007 and remained in the third tier with Arsenal-Kyivshchyna Bila Tserkva the following season.

He would in his debut season with Bila Tserkva help the club secure a promotion by finishing second in the standings. In 2009, he signed a contract with FC Poltava. After a season in Poltava, he played abroad in Poland to sign with Hetman Zolkiewka of the IV liga, and also played with Partyzant Targowiska. In 2011, he returned to Ukraine to play with UkrAhroKom Holovkivka, and received another stint in the first league with FC Tytan Armyansk. After a brief stint in the first league, he returned to the second league to play with MFC Kremin Kremenchuk.

He was shortly after loaned to league rivals Shakhtar Sverdlovsk in 2103. He went once more across the border to Poland in 2014 to play in the IV liga and III liga with Hetman Zolkiewka and Tomasovia Tomaszów Lubelski.

FC Ukraine United 
In 2016, he went overseas to Canada to sign with FC Ukraine United in the Canadian Soccer League. He recorded his first goal for the organization on June 12, 2016, in a 3-2 victory over Hamilton City SC. In his debut season, he assisted the club in securing a postseason berth for the club by finishing second in the standings. In the first round of the playoffs, he contributed a goal in a 3-0 victory over Brantford Galaxy. Following their victory, they were eliminated from the playoffs after a 1-0 loss to the Serbian White Eagles. He was awarded the CSL Golden Boot for finishing as the league's top goalscorer with 15 goals.

Vorkuta 
After the relegation of FC Ukraine to the Second Division, he signed with FC Vorkuta. Throughout the season he finished as the club's top goalscorer with 13 goals and secured the regular-season title. In his second season with Vorkuta he assisted in securing the CSL Championship, and for the second consecutive year finished as the club's top goalscorer. In 2020, he assisted in securing Vorkuta's second championship title after defeating Scarborough SC.

In 2021, he assisted in securing Vorkuta's third regular-season title and secured the ProSound Cup against Scarborough. He also played in the 2021 playoffs where Vorkuta was defeated by Scarborough in the championship final. In 2022, Vorkuta was renamed FC Continentals and he re-signed with the club for the season where he served as the team captain. In his sixth season with the club, he helped Continentals secure a postseason berth by finishing fourth in the standings. He helped the club secure their third championship title after defeating Scarborough in the finals.

Honors 

FC Vorkuta
 CSL Championship: 2018, 2020, 2022
 Canadian Soccer League First Division/Regular Season: 2017, 2019, 2021 
ProSound Cup: 2021

FC Ukraine United 
 CSL Golden Boot: 2016

References 

1984 births
Living people
People from Novoukrainka
Ukrainian footballers
Ukrainian expatriate footballers
FC Hazovyk-KhGV Kharkiv players
FC Dnipro Cherkasy players
FC Borysfen Boryspil players
FC Arsenal Kharkiv players
FC Arsenal-Kyivshchyna Bila Tserkva players
FC Poltava players
FC UkrAhroKom Holovkivka players
FC Tytan Armyansk players
FC Kremin Kremenchuk players
FC Shakhtar Sverdlovsk players
FC Ukraine United players
FC Continentals players
Canadian Soccer League (1998–present) players
Expatriate soccer players in Canada
Expatriate footballers in Poland
Association football forwards
Ukrainian First League players
Ukrainian expatriate sportspeople in Canada
Ukrainian Second League players
III liga players
Sportspeople from Kirovohrad Oblast